Montortal is a pedania of l'Alcúdia in the province of Valencia, Spain, situated about two kilometres south of the centre of the town. Formerly it was owned  by the Marquesses of Montortal. 

Montortal is a small village (100 inhabitants) set amongst the orange and caqui groves in an intensive agricultural area. Although Montortal has a reasonably high gipsy population in comparison to most other villages in the area it is well known and respected for its integration between races and is now beginning to experience a resurgence of population and restoration. Situated approximately 25 km  from the beaches of the Costa del Azahar, the Valencia bay and 35 km from Valencia. 

It is one of the few original villages in the area to remain untouched by developers, mainly because most of the village sits on non urbanizable land causing planning permissions to be either extremely difficult or impossible to obtain.

Montortal has a church circa 1716, devoted to the Virgin Mary, which has been basically abandoned by the cathedral of San Andrés in l'Alcúdia which took over the church and area in 1902; church services are no longer held in the village.

Ribera Alta (comarca)